A weasel is a small carnivorous mammal.
 
Weasel may also refer to:

Places
 Weasel Gap, Prince Charles Mountains, Antarctica
 Weasel Hill, Graham Land, Antarctica

People
 Weasel Walter, jazz composer and instrumentalist
 Ben Weasel (born 1968), punk rock musician (born Benjamin Foster)
 Jimmy Fratianno (1913–1993), American gangster, known as Jimmy the Weasel
 Robert Guiscard (c. 1015–1085), Norman adventurer, know as the Weasel
 Bobby Heenan (1944-2017), American professional wrestling manager and commentator, sometimes called the weasel
 "The Weasel", an alter ego persona of Pauly Shore (born 1968), American actor, comedian, director, writer and producer
 Dave Weasel (real name Dave Wezl, born 1984), Canadian-American comedian

Arts and entertainment

Fictional characters
 Weasel (DC Comics), two villains
 Weasel (Marvel Comics), a sidekick
 Weasel, in The Animals of Farthing Wood franchise
 Weasel, in the Crusader game series
 I.M. Weasel, in I Am Weasel, an American animated television series

Other
 The Weasels, a rock band
 Weasel, a comic book series by Dave Cooper

Vehicles
 M29 Weasel, American World War II tracked vehicle
 Westland Weasel, a prototype British two-seat fighter/reconnaissance aircraft of the First World War
 Weasel, an Owl class South Devon Railway 0-4-0 locomotives
 Weasel, a tug formerly called the Empire Madge

Other uses
 Operation Weasel, an alleged secret operation involving the governments of Nauru, New Zealand and the United States

See also
 Spinner's weasel, a mechanical yarn measuring device
 Weasel word, a statement designed to deceive with vague or unspecified authority
 "Pop! Goes the Weasel", 19th century song
 La Fouine (French for "the Weasel"), stage name of French singer Laouni Mouhid (born 1981)
 Bryan Ruiz, (born 1985), Costa Rican football player nicknamed "la comadreja" ("the weasel")